Mukendi Mbuyi (born 26 April 1960) is a Congolese basketball player. She competed in the women's tournament at the 1996 Summer Olympics.

References

1960 births
Living people
Democratic Republic of the Congo women's basketball players
Olympic basketball players of the Democratic Republic of the Congo
Basketball players at the 1996 Summer Olympics
People from Kananga